Astropecten aranciacus, the red comb star, is a sea star of the family Astropectinidae. It is native to the east Atlantic Ocean (Portugal to Angola) and Mediterranean Sea.

Habitat and behaviour
Astropecten aranciacus lives very near the coast, and at low tide it buries itself in the sand, showing only the centre of its upper side which is swollen in the form of a cone. This cone acts like a sense organ. When it is touched, the cone contracts and the starfish buries itself on the sand again. Then at high tide, the starfish reappears on the surface of the substrate. It buries itself in the sand to shield parts of its body from the rays of the sun, especially the bottom surface which has no coloured pigment and is therefore particularly sensitive.
This species is active and easy to find in the late afternoon and during the night.

Description
This starfish has superomarginal plates equipped with 1 to 3 small spines and inferomarginal plates with long, pointed, strong, regularly arranged spines. The inferomarginal spines have reddish-orange colour at the base and yellowish or white colour towards the tip. It is rugged with normal size disc and pointed arms. The colour of the aboral side is given by a succession of paxillae (from the top they look like round points) with upper extremity red-orange in various combinations with paxillae with upper extremity grey or beige. The superomarginal plates are usually grey or beige homogeneous.

It is a starfish with a lot of features and can be distinguished easily from the other species by colour and size. Sometimes it is confused with Astropecten irregularis.

Feeding
This sea star is a carnivore and feeds on molluscs, which it catches with its arms and then takes to the mouth. The prey is then trapped by the long, moving prickles around the mouth cavity.

References

 Roberto Pillon (2009). Astropecten of the Mediterranean Sea
 Koehler, Réné. 1921. Faune de France. Echinodermes.
 Tortonese, Enrico. 1965. Fauna d'Italia. Echinodermata.
 Ludwig, Hubert. 1897. Die Seesterne des Mittelmeeres. Zoologischen station zu Neapel.

External links 

 Downloadable WoRMS: Roberto Pillon (2009). Astropecten of the Mediterranean Sea
 Downloadable WoRMS: Roberto Pillon (2009). Orientarsi in un mare di stelle
 DORIS 
 Naturamediterraneo
 
 	

Astropecten
Fauna of the Atlantic Ocean
Fauna of the Mediterranean Sea
Animals described in 1758
Taxa named by Carl Linnaeus